Mir Changez Khan Jamali  is a Pakistani politician who was a member of the National Assembly of Pakistan from 2008 to 2013.

Political career
He ran for the seat of the Provincial Assembly of Balochistan as a candidate of Pakistan Peoples Party (PPP) from Constituency PB-26 (Nasirabad-II) in 2008 Pakistani general election but was unsuccessful. He received 9,204 votes and lost the seat to Zahoor Hussain Khoso.

He was elected unopposed to the National Assembly of Pakistan from Constituency NA-266 (Nasirabad-cum-Jaffarabad) as a candidate of PPP in by-election held in May 2009. On 11 February 2011, he was inducted into the federal cabinet of Prime Minister Yousaf Raza Gillani and was appointed as Federal Minister for Science and Technology where he continued to serve until 19 June 2012. On 22 June 2012, he was inducted into the federal cabinet of Prime Minister Raja Pervaiz Ashraf and was re-appointed as Federal Minister for Science and Technology where he continued to serve until 16 March 2013.

He ran for the seat of the National Assembly from Constituency NA-266 (Nasirabad-cum-Jaffarabad) as a candidate of PPP in 2013 Pakistani general election, but was unsuccessful. He received 17,404 votes and lost the seat to Zafarullah Khan Jamali.

References

Living people
Pakistani MNAs 2008–2013
Year of birth missing (living people)